Seven ships of the Royal Navy have borne the name HMS Hawke, after an archaic spelling of the bird, the hawk. Two of the later ships were named after Edward Hawke, 1st Baron Hawke, whilst another was planned:

  was a discovery vessel launched in 1593.  Her fate is unknown.
  was an 8-gun ketch launched in 1655 and sold in 1667.
 was an 8-gun fire ship launched in 1690 and sunk as a foundation in 1712.
  was an 8-gun sloop launched in 1721 and was presumed to have foundered in 1739 in the Atlantic after she left Charleston, South Carolina for England.
  was a 4-gun former Dutch hoy purchased in 1794 that sank at her moorings in Plymouth dockyard in 1796.
  was laid down as a 74-gun third-rate ship of the line, but was altered to carry 60 guns before being launched in 1820.  She was refitted with screw propulsion in 1855 and was broken up in 1865.
  was an  protected cruiser launched in 1891. She was involved in a collision with the liner  in 1911. A U-boat sank Hawke in 1914.
 HMS Hawke was to have been a   Started in 1943, her hull, machinery, boilers and three triple Mk 24 DP 6-inch gun mounts were largely complete when cancelled in 1945 and was broken up on the slipway.
 HMS Hawke was a shore establishment at Exbury House, Hampshire, between 1946 and 1955.

See also
 Royal Navy ships named

Notes

References
 
 
 

Royal Navy ship names